This is a list of gaps and passes in Hong Kong.

Hong Kong Island
Chai Wan Gap (柴灣峽)
Magazine Gap (馬己仙峽)
Middle Gap (中峽)
Pottinger Gap (馬塘坳)
Quarry Gap (大風坳)
Sandy Bay Gap (沙灣坳)
Tai Tam Gap (大潭峽)
Tsin Shui Wan Au (淺水灣凹)
Victoria Gap (爐峰峽)
Wan Chai Gap (灣仔峽)
Windy Gap (大風坳, also 大風凹)
Wong Nai Chung Gap (黃泥涌峽)

New Territories

Between New Kowloon and New Territories
Cha Liu Au (茶寮凹)
Kowloon Pass (九龍凹)
Ma Yau Tong Au (馬游塘坳)
Pak Kung Au (伯公凹)
Sha Tin Pass (沙田坳)
Tate's Pass (大老坳)
Tiu Keng Leng Au (調景嶺坳)
Tiu Tso Ngam (吊草巖)

Mainland of New Territories

Chui Fung Au (吹風坳)
Chui Tung Au (吹筒坳)
Lead Mine Pass (鉛礦坳)
Ma On Au (馬鞍坳)
Pak Tam Au (北潭坳)
Pik Uk Au (壁屋凹)
Shek Hang Au (石坑坳)
Shui Long Wo (水浪窩)
Tai Au Mun (大坳門, also 大澳門)
Tai Long Au (大浪坳)
Tai Miu Au (大廟坳)
Tai Po Tsai Au (大埔仔坳)
Tin Ha Au (田下坳)
Tsuen Kam Au (荃錦坳), where Route Twisk passes by.
Yung Pak Au (榕北坳)

Lantau Island
Fan Shui Au (分水坳)
Heung Chung Au (響鐘坳)
Kan Tau Au (根頭坳)
Mong To Au (望渡坳)
Nam Shan (南山)
Ngong Shuen Au (昂船凹)
Pak Kung Au (also known as Tung Chung Gap, Tung Chung Au) (伯公坳, also 東涌坳)
Sam Pak Au (三白坳)
Shap Long Au (十塱坳)
Sheung Tung Au (雙東坳)
Sze Pak Au (四白坳)
Tai Fung Au (大風坳)
Wo Sheung Au (禾上坳)
Yi Pak Au (二白坳)

On other islands in the New Territories

 
Hong Kong
Gaps